Hakka Hakki (Nepali: हकका हक्की पक्का पक्कि) is a Nepali sitcom television series which began in 2016. The series is uploaded to Highlights Nepal Pvt. Ltd every week.

Cast
Daman Rupakheti as Punte
Kabita Sharma as Punti
Raju Bhuju
Ram Thapa
Umesh Kumar KC
Prakash Neupane
Shiva Sharma
Janak Prasad Bartaula
Simran Paudel
Sujit Thapa
Parwan Rai
Dharanidhar Neupane
Maniraj Kafley
Rajan Chaulagai
R. K. Manandhar
Raj Kumar Kunwar
Santosh Sapkota
Sushant Giri

Story
People in the village fool each other to gain something.

References

Nepalese television sitcoms
Nepalese television series
2010s Nepalese television series
2015 Nepalese television series debuts